Polyptychus bernardii is a moth of the family Sphingidae. It is known from Gabon, the Congo and from the Central African Republic.

References

Polyptychus
Moths described in 1966
Insects of Cameroon
Insects of the Democratic Republic of the Congo
Fauna of the Central African Republic
Fauna of Gabon
Moths of Africa